The 2021 Rugby Europe U20 Championship was the fourth edition of the tournament. It took place in  Coimbra, Portugal between 7–13 November. The competition consisted of eight teams and was a direct eliminations tournament (knock-out matches) with classification matches. All the teams played three matches during the competition. Spain defeated Portugal 15–9 to win the Under 20 Championship. Czechia and Poland had qualified for the U20 Championship in a qualifier that included Switzerland in the 2019/2020 season. 

The tournament was scheduled for March 2020 but was postponed to 2021 due to the COVID-19 pandemic.

Teams

Results

Round 1

Quarter-finals

Round 2

5th-7th Place Semi-finals

Cup Semi-finals

Round 3

3rd Place

7th Place

Cup Final

5th Place Final

Bracket

Cup Quarterfinals

5th/7th Place Playoffs

References 

2021 in European sport
2021 rugby union tournaments for national teams
Rugby Europe U20
International rugby union competitions hosted by Portugal
Rugby Europe U20